Remeta can refer to:

 Mala Remeta, a village in Srem, Vojvodina, Serbia
 Mala Remeta Monastery
 Velika Remeta, a village in Srem, Vojvodina, Serbia
 Velika Remeta Monastery

See also
 Remete (disambiguation)